Ryan Ryan Musikahan is a Philippine late night weekly musical show on ABS-CBN, which ran from June 2, 1988, to July 6, 1995, hosted by Maestro Ryan Cayabyab.

Format
The show featured some of the local and international artists thru musical numbers. The original version of the show was directed by Leo Rialp, who replaced Menchu Dalusong.

In 1993, the show was reformatted and was held at various locations outside the studio (e.g. hotels).

Host
Ryan Cayabyab

Re-runs and specials
The show currently airs re-runs every Saturday evening, 11:30 PM  on Jeepney TV.

Since being reaired on the Jeepney TV, various specials have been produced by the channel such as "Ryan Ryan Musikahan: Home For Christmas", a 2015 Christmas special; and "Ryan Ryan Musikahan: Piyano At Gitara" which was aired on August 20, 2016, and was directed by Johnny Manahan. Other specials include "Para sa Bayan: A Ryan Ryan Musikahan Special" and "Ryan Ryan Musikahan: Christmas From the Heart".

Accolades

See also
List of shows previously aired by ABS-CBN
List of programs broadcast by Jeepney TV

References

External links

1988 Philippine television series debuts
1995 Philippine television series endings
ABS-CBN original programming
Filipino-language television shows
Philippine variety television shows